The Rinus Michels Award is an annual prize in Dutch football. It is supported by the official football coaches union ("Coaches Betaald Voetbal"). The award is named after Rinus Michels, who was named coach of the century by FIFA in 1999.

Categories
 Manager of the year in the Eredivisie
 Manager of the year in the Eerste Divisie
 Manager of the year in amateur football
 Youth academies of the year in professional football
 Youth academies of the year in amateur football
 Overall oeuvre prize

Winners Manager of the Year Eredivisie

Winners Manager of the Year Eerste Divisie 
 Maurice Steijn (2017)
 Michael Reiziger (2018)
 Marino Pušić (2019)
 Henk de Jong (2021)
 Dick Lukkien (2022)

Winners Manager of the Year in Amateur Football

Lifetime prize winners
The following managers have been awarded the lifetime prize for their contributions spanning their entire career:
Kees Rijvers (2004)
Piet de Visser (2005)
Wiel Coerver (2008)
Foppe de Haan (2009)
Leo Beenhakker (2010)
Louis van Gaal (2013)
Guus Hiddink (2015)
Johan Cruyff (2016)
Co Adriaanse (2017)
Dick Advocaat (2021)
Bert van Marwijk (2022)

References

Eredivisie trophies and awards
Eerste Divisie trophies and awards
 
Netherlands
Dutch sports trophies and awards
Football in the Netherlands